The Tower Bridge is a vertical lift bridge across the Sacramento River, linking West Sacramento in Yolo County to the west, with the capital of California, Sacramento, in Sacramento County to the east.  It has also been known as M Street Bridge. It was previously a part of U.S. Route 40 until that highway was truncated to east of Salt Lake City as well as US Route 99W, which served the western portion of the Sacramento Valley from Sacramento to Red Bluff. The bridge is maintained by the California Department of Transportation as part of State Route 275 and connects West Capitol Avenue and Tower Bridge Gateway in West Sacramento with the Capitol Mall in Sacramento.

In 1982, the Tower Bridge was added to the National Register of Historic Places.

History

Developing the bridge
The Tower Bridge replaced the 1911 M Street Bridge in Sacramento, which was originally a swing through-truss railroad bridge. Later,  roadway sections were added as cantilevered sections on both sides of the existing rail bridge. Sacramento's population more than doubled between 1910 and 1935, rendering the existing bridge inadequate. In 1933, the city realized that it needed a better crossing over the Sacramento River in case of war.

On December 22, 1933, the State of California, Sacramento County, and the Sacramento Northern Railway held a conference to plan the new bridge, with an agreement reached on March 8, 1934. Under the terms of the agreement, Sacramento Northern Railway relinquished its rights to the 1911 M Street Bridge in return for the rights to rail traffic over the new bridge until March 21, 1960, which was the original expiration date of its franchise to operate rail traffic over the 1911 bridge. Construction commenced on July 20, 1934.

Design

 
Although the lift span weighs , the use of an equal amount of counterweights (located in each tower) means the span is operated with two relatively small  electric motors.

The bridge style represents a rare use of Streamline Moderne architectural styling in a lift bridge, making it an outstanding expression of the social and architectural climate of the period of construction. The lift span towers were sheathed in steel to streamline its appearance. The American Institute of Steel Construction gave the Tower Bridge an honorable mention for its Class B prize bridge award in 1935.

On December 15, 1935, then-governor Frank Merriam dedicated the bridge, and led the inaugural parade across it. 1000 homing pigeons were released to carry the news throughout California. The first train had crossed the bridge on November 7, 1935. The Tower Bridge was the first vertical lift bridge in the California Highway System after it was formally accepted by the state on January 11, 1936.

The railroad tracks were removed in 1963. With the removal of the tracks, the roadway was restriped for four automobile lanes. Due to the nearby railroad tracks, the grade crossing on the east side is designed to act as a secondary barrier to exclude vehicular traffic while the bridge is raised. When the warning siren sounds, the crossing activates to block traffic until the bridge is safe for use.

Repainting the bridge
For years, the bridge was painted with a silver aluminum paint under a special work order, but people complained about glare off the bridge. The concrete pylons were initially painted a sky-blue color. In June 1976 as part of Bicentennial projects, it was painted a yellow-ochre color to match the gold leafed cupola on the nearby State Capitol.

In 2001, as the old paint job could hardly be distinguished, residents who lived within  of the capital voted on a new color scheme. Their choices were all-gold; green, gold and silver; or burgundy, silver and gold. The winning choice was all gold, and it was repainted in 2002.  However, that did not lessen the bridge's color controversy. Some people complained that the new paint was not as gilded as advertised. Others have suggested that copper would have been a far better color choice, especially in the context of nearby buildings. The new coat is expected to last 30 years.

Reinstalling rail
, the bridge is used for pedestrian and vehicle traffic only. By 2007, regional transportation agencies were considering the possibility of adding trolley traffic across the bridge. In 2020, these plans had changed to call for an extension of RT Light Rail to utilize the deck to provide service to West Sacramento.

See also

 Capitol Mall
 History of Sacramento, California
 Old Sacramento State Historic Park
List of bridges documented by the Historic American Engineering Record in California
 National Register of Historic Places listings in Sacramento County, California
 California Historical Landmarks in Sacramento County, California
 Sacramento Northern Railroad

References

External links

History of Tower Bridge photo essay
 
 
 

Bridges over the Sacramento River
Bridges in Sacramento County, California
Bridges in Yolo County, California
Buildings and structures in Sacramento, California
Vertical lift bridges in California
Transportation in Sacramento, California
Steel bridges in the United States
Bridges of the United States Numbered Highway System
U.S. Route 40
Bridges completed in 1935
1935 establishments in California
Drawbridges on the National Register of Historic Places
National Register of Historic Places in Sacramento, California
Railroad bridges on the National Register of Historic Places in California
Road bridges on the National Register of Historic Places in California
Historic American Engineering Record in California
Streamline Moderne architecture in California